Zicman Feider (1903–1979) was a Jewish Romanian acarologist, a remarkable researcher and a gifted academic, whose work continues to influence by many generations of biologists, some of whom studied zoology under his supervision. His name as a researcher is forever associated with the enigmatic group of Acari a.k.a. Acarina (a taxon of arachnids that contains mites and ticks), for which he arduously worked to perfect their taxonomy. Alone or in collaboration with his numerous disciples, he described and created 1 phalanx and 2 sub-phalanxes, 16 families and 8 subfamilies, 40 genera, 4 subgenera, and 145 species new to science. 
One could only compare professor Feider's work with that of Aristide Caradgea, who studied micro-Lepidoptera, attracting all the world researchers of that group to come in a pilgrimage to his modest place in Grumazesti, Neamț, Romania. Similarly, Feider's strenuous line of work encompassed Acari collections from all over Europe, St. Helen Island, North Korea, Nepal, Mongolia, India, Vietnam, Brazil, Venezuela, and Chile, making his lab in the Alexandru Ioan Cuza University (Romanian: Universitatea „Alexandru Ioan Cuza"; acronym: UAIC), of Iași, Romania, a Mecca of the world's acarologists.

Early life
Feider was born on April 17, 1903, in Roman, in the province of Moldova, Romania, the eldest of seven children of Beila and Daniel (Idel) Feider, of Ashkenazy Jewish ethnicity. Beila and Daniel Feider were owners of a small rotary-shop (wagons were then in great demand), and as the Jewish tradition still demands, they saved most of their income to offer their son the best opportunity to study to become a "doctor". Their hopes were sustained by the excellent performance of their young studious son Zicman, who graduated the gymnasium and the prestigious Lyceum "Roman Vodă", with best possible grades.

Higher education
In 1922, after receiving his baccalaureate, he enrolled in the University of Pavia, Italy, as a foreign student. From 1923 to 1925, Feider attended Histology and Pathology classes of the famous professor Camillo Golgi, the scientist-physician who discovered the Golgi apparatus, the Golgi tendon organ and the Golgi tendon reflex. Unfortunately, the student Feider was feeding himself poorly, and in 1925, after three years of starvation, he contracted pulmonary tuberculosis, which was still ravaging lives at the time.

Forced to leave his studies in Italy, he returned to Romania, and was admitted to the Tuberculosis Sanatorium of Bârnova, close to Iași, where he strictly followed the rudimentary anti-tuberculous of treatment of that time. Weakened, but still willing to study Medicine he enrolled in the Faculty of Medicine of Iași University, and in 1928, he was immediately accepted due to his fine work in Pavia.
Most unfortunately, the rise of anti-Semitic feelings throughout most of the students and some faculty members, and the lack of Jewish cadavers for Anatomy study (Jewish students were not allowed to dissect Christian cadavers), forced Zicman to quit studying medicine at Iași. Nevertheless, his desire to continue studying was paramount, so he enrolled at the Faculty of Natural Sciences, at the University of Chernivtsi (founded in 1875 as the Franz-Josephs-Universität Czernowitz), when Chernivtsi (Cernăuți in Romanian) was the capital of the Duchy of Bukovina, nicknamed "Little Vienna", part of the Austrian Empire. Zicman Feider studied only one year there, and then moved back to Iași, province of Moldova.
Back in Iași,  he studied from 1930 to 1933, at the Natural Sciences section, of the Science Faculty at the Alexandru Ioan Cuza University, previously known as "Michaelian Academy" of Iași, from which he graduated with honors in 1933. During this time, he learned from famous academicians, professors and academic researchers, like Ioan Borcea, Paul Bujor, and Constantin Motaș. Here, he also begun working with his future illustrious zoologist colleagues Mihai Băcescu, Sergiu Cărăușu, and Alexandru V. Grossu.

Post-graduation and early working years

Feider started as a teacher in his native city of Roman, and then taught in the town of Târgu Ocna until he passed his Teacher's Capacity Examination in 1935. Having obtained his Capacity Degree, he was hired as teacher of Natural Sciences at the "St. O. Iosif Boys Lyceum" in Odorheiu Secuiesc (Hungarian: Székelyudvarhely), Harghita County, Transylvania, Romania. The renowned educational institution, which preserves until today inside its yard the ruins of a Roman castrum, was named after a prematurely dead Romanian pre-symbolist poet, Ștefan Octavian Iosif,. 
In 1938, Feider married Ilona Pal, a local Székely person, who was a graduate of Benedek Elek Teachers' College, who eagerly defended her right to marry a Jew, during the reign of an antisemitic right-wing government.
Feider permanently maintained his association with the professors from Alexandru Ioan Cuza University, and the eminent biologist Constantin Motaș, renowned specialist in hydro-Acari, who suggested that he should start researching the earth-Acari. As a result, the still young and very passionate Zicman was rummaging through the litter of the orchards of Harghita County in search of mites. He had the admiration and support of the Lyceum principal, Professor Ioan Steriopol, who was proud to befriend him. Working intensively as a teacher, researcher and pedagogue, Professor Feider helped establish the Natural Science Museum in Odorheiu Secuiesc. 
In 1938, Zicman Feider published in the "Annals of the Alexandru Ioan Cuza University" one of the discoveries of his passionate, under the title "Sur une espèce nouvelle de genre Euthrombidium" (About a new species of Euthrombidium).

Unfortunately, the atmosphere in   Odorheiu Secuiesc became incendiary after the 30 August 1940 - "Vienna Diktat", when Hungary received northern Transylvania from Romania, and the anti-Semitic manifestation became so pervasive that Zicman and his pregnant wife were forced to leave Transylvania for Moldova. 
Temporarily jobless and stigmatized as a Jew, Zicman sought to work as a teacher in Piatra Neamț, and eventually he found an opportunity to teach at the "Jewish Lyceum" of the city of Roman, Romania, at the end of 1940. His industrious work and his leadership skills were so well respected, he became the Principal of the "Jewish Lyceum", where he worked until 1944, during World War II.

From 1944 to 1949, he continued to work as a Biology teacher at "Roman's Boys Lyceum" and at the "Commercial Lyceum" of the City of Roman. Meanwhile, his research was extremely active, resulting in the publication of several papers on Trombidiidae (a.k.a. Red Velvet Mites or Rain Bugs, arachnids found in soil litter known for their bright red colors), in 1945.

Academic and scientific activity
In 1947, he successfully defended his Ph.D. thesis under the supervision of Professor Constantin Motaș, entitled "The Respiratory Apparatus in Trombidiidae and Superior Prostigmata". For his extraordinary work, Zicman Feider obtained the qualification magna cum laude.
In 1949, he was appointed as an associate professor at the Department of Zoology of the Natural Science Faculty at Alexandru Ioan Cuza University, Iași, and his alma mater.
In 1950, he was coopted in the formal "Research Group for Romanian Fauna", affiliated with the Scientific Section of the Romanian Academy, as head of the "Fauna Group" from the Iași Branch.

In 1955, Feider published a remarkable work "The Monograph of Trombidiidae", included in the "Fauna" collection of the Romanian Academy Press.
In 1959, he became Full Professor with tenure at the Department of Zoology of the Natural Science Faculty at Alexandru Ioan Cuza University, Iași. 
He was designated  as titular for the Course of Vertebrate Zoology (the biological discipline that consists of the study of Vertebrate animals, i.e., animals with a backbone, such as fish, amphibians, reptiles, birds and mammals) (see  Curs de zoologia vertebratelor). He also taught other courses like General Zoology, and Parasitology.

In 1965, he published "Superfamily Ixodoidea" (containing the family Ixodidae – hard ticks), another monograph in the "Fauna" collection of the Romanian Academy Press. 
In the same year 1965, after years of collaborative work with his Romanian colleagues from the universities of Bucharest and Cluj, Professor Zicman Feider published the first edition of "The Vertebrate Zoology". This monumental work was reedited twice (see ZOOLOGIA VERTEBRATELOR de Z. FEIDER, AL. V. GROSSU, ST. GYURKO si V. POP 1967 & ZOOLOGIA VERTEBRATELOR - Z. FEIDER, AL. V. GROSSU, ST. GYURKO si V. POP BUCUREȘTI. 1976), and can be found as PDF file on Internet.

As a vertebrate zoologist, Feider surrounded himself with other members of the department of Zoology, developing several lines of research for each of them, mentoring them to successfully defending their Ph.D. theses. All those collaborators – Libertina Solomon, Viorica Simionescu, Iulia Mironescu, Nicolai Valenciuc, and Iordache Ion became full professors and accomplished researchers. Some of their joint lines of research topics were "The hyoid-mandibular apparatus in fishes" and "The relative growth in some fish species". The work was done at the "Marine Biological Station Professor Doctor Ioan Borcea", Agigea, Romania, founded in 1926 at the Border of the Black Sea, as an external research institution pertaining to the Alexandru Ioan Cuza University, Iași.

Concomitantly, Feider supervised other Ph.D. theses of several zoologists working at other Romanian Universities or at some remote biology research centers. He also never lost contact with the high-school education in Romania, and was invited almost every year to preside over Baccalaureate Committees in the largest cities of the Province of Moldova, Romania. In fact, the textbooks of Zoology for high schools in Romania all had his magisterial book "The Vertebrate Zoology" as reference. 
Feider's work with mites and ticks became very well known abroad, and more specialists in the field were interested in his work. He carried out the taxonomical and systematical study of many Acarina groups: Ixodoidea, Oribatidae, Gamasidea, Rhinonyssidae, Erythraeidea, and Prostigmata from Romania; Nicolletiellidae and Sternostoma genus throughout the world. He found phylogenetic indicators in the structures of trichobotrias, aspis, and genital and anal plaques in the larva chetotaxis and visual organs at Ixodidae or in the breathing apparatus, metopic edge and genital structure of Trombidia.

Meanwhile, he joined several scientific societies in Europe and the US, and was appointed to the  editorial board of the publication Acarologia – a quarterly peer-reviewed open-access scientific journal covering all aspects of acarology, established by Marc André and François Grandjean in 1959. 
Some acarologists sent him their own collections for studying, to avoid name-redundancy. Feider therefore was comparing Acari from all over the world with the holotypes (holotype - a single type specimen upon which the description and name of a new species is based) pertaining to his personal collection. 
Feider transmitted his passion for acarology to a group of researchers from the Center for Biological Research - Nicu Vasiliu, Magda Călugăr, Mărioara Huțu, Maria Calistru and few others, who were his devoted disciples, while working at the "General and Applied Biology Institute" of the Iași branch of the Romanian Academy. They represented the growing school of Romanian acarologists, unparalleled until today.

Death
Feider died after his fourth heart attack (he survived three previous attacks), while his third monography about Trombiculoidea was given for publication to the "Fauna" collection of the Romanian Academy Press.

Legacy
The personal "Acari and Ixodidae collection" of Feider, a true scientific thesaurus gathered during decades of arduous work, was donated to the Natural History Museum of Iași, a prestigious institution founded in 1834, and is the first museum of this kind in Romania. 
As evidence of the appreciation for his dedication to the science, several acarologists felt compelled to immortalize the name Zicman Feider, by dedicating his name to newly identified species of Acari. For instance, Subias created the genus Feiderzetes - Feiderzetes latus in 1977. After his passing, one of his collaborators and colleagues, Libertina Solomon created the species Myonyssus feideri, and two of his close scientific correspondents, Balogh and Mahunka created the species Phteracorus zicmani.
Feider remains in the memory of those who knew him as an eminent academic figure, with not only a vast knowledge of biology, but also a person who spread human warmth. He was a devoted father and grandfather, whose three children followed his example, choosing academic careers: Noemi Bomher - professor of Romanian literature, Daniela Kocsis – teacher of mathematics, and the junior Almos Bela Trif – physician and professor of pathology.

References

Contribution of the Romanian Jews to Culture and Civilisation, Federation of Jewish Communities of Romania, Hasefer Press, Bucharest, 2004, 
 Contribuția evreilor români la cultură și civilizație, Federația Comunităților Evreiești din România, Editura Hasefer, București, 
Ionel Maftei - Personalități Ieșene, Vol. IV. Omagiu, Comitetul de cultură și educație socialistă al județului Iași, 1982
 Profesor dr. docent Zicman Feider. Flacăra Iașului, 36, nr. 10261, 30 sept. 1979, p. 3
Libertina Solomon - Zicman Feider (1903-1979). Acarologia (Paris), tome XXI, fasc.1, Jan.1980, p. 1-2
Neculai Vasiliu, Magda Călugăr, Marina Huțu - Zicman Feider (1903-1979). Travaux du Muséum d'Histoire naturelle Grigore Antipa (București), vol. XXI, 1980, p. 385-386.
Vasiliu, George D. – Feider Zicman in "Biologi din România: (Biologie animală)", Editura Ion Borcea, 705 pages, pp. 219–225, 2001. 
Gheorghe Mustață, Mariana Mustață – "Prof. Dr. Zicman Feider" (1903 – 1979) "Personalități ale biologiei românești și universale" (Personalities of Romanian and World's Biologists), Editura Academiei Oamenilor de Știință din România, 2014, 796 pages, pp. 199 – 202, 

1903 births
1979 deaths
20th-century Romanian zoologists
Romanian entomologists
Romanian Jews
Moldavian Jews
People from Roman, Romania